Westvale may refer to:

 Westvale, Queensland, a locality in the Somerset Region, Queensland, Australia
 Westvale, Merseyside, a location in England
 Westvale, New York, a suburban community in Onondaga County, New York, United States